The Women's U23 road race at the 2008 European Road Championships took place on July 5. The Championships were hosted in Italy. The course was 129.6 km long, started in Pallanza at 09:00 and finished in Verbania.

Final classification

s.t. = same time

References

External links

2008 European Road Championships
European Road Championships – Women's U23 road race
2008 in women's road cycling